
Bodo ("His Servant" or "In His Hand") also known as Boödes (Boṓdēs), was a Carthaginian senator and naval officer (hypostrategos) who served during the First Punic War. He commanded a successful expedition to Lipara where he captured the Roman consul Gn. Cornelius Scipio Asina.

See also
 Baal Hamon & Melqart, major Punic deities

References

Citations

Bibliography
 . 
 . 

Carthaginian commanders of the First Punic War
Navy officers
3rd-century BC Punic people